Darius Shavaksha Jhabvala (1936-1974) was an Indian-American journalist and diplomatic correspondent for the Boston Globe. Jhabvala's reporting was marked by his keen insight and ability to break major stories. He was the first to report on the U.S. incursion into Cambodia in 1970, and later broke the news that Canada was soon to establish diplomatic relations with the People's Republic of China. He was also the first U.S. correspondent to detail the maneuvers of the Soviet navy in the Indian Ocean.

Early life and education 
Jhabvala was born in Bombay, India, in 1936, to a family with a rich political legacy. He was an ethnic Parsi and wrote the entry for The Parsis in the Encyclopaedia Americana. Jhabvala moved to the United States in 1947 and attended the Latin School of Chicago before earning a degree in diplomacy. He studied at the University of Bombay, Colgate University and Columbia University. He is described by Kissinger as having retained his Indian passport and feeling torn between India and the United States. 

His great-grandfather was a founder of the Indian National Congress, and his family was deeply involved in Indian politics, leading Henry Kissinger to jokingly refer to him as the 'real Boston Brahmin'.

His father, Shavaksha Hormasji Jhabvala was a distinguished intellectual and activist in his own right. He was a Persian scholar, author and a leader in India's Independence Movement and the founder of the All-India Trade Union Movement. His formidable oeuvre spanned a wide range of topics, from the intricate dynamics of prohibition to the afflictions of leprosy, from the intricacies of trade unionism to the philosophical underpinnings of the Gita. Additionally, he devoted his scholarly attention to exploring the rich history of the Parsees, and examining the verses of Kabir. Mr. Jhabvala's literary accomplishments were complemented by his equally noteworthy activism. He was the founder of multiple trade unions and played a central role in the infamous Meerut Conspiracy Case, which culminated in his arrested. His mother, Meher Mehta Jhabvala was a civic leader and the president of the All-India Women's Conference.

Career 
Jhabvala began his career working for the United Nations in New York, where he gained valuable experience in international affairs. Later, he became an instructor at the Latin American Institute in New York and an assistant editor for Newsweek.

Jhabvala was widely respected by his colleagues in the State Department and beyond. He served as the president of the State Department Correspondents Association, where he was known for his insightful reporting and impeccable professionalism. Jhabvala was also known for his warmth, gentleness, and deep humanity and was often described as the most popular man in the State Department Press Corp.

Known for his soft British colonial accent and self-deprecating humor, Jhabvala was beloved by his colleagues in the State Department press corps. NBC correspondent Richard Valeriani once described him as "Mr. Chips - lovable, fun to tease, but the guy we went to when we needed advice."

Secretary of State Henry Kissinger, who praised him as a "great human being" and a "unique friend." He described his job tracking Kissinger, as "Trying to track sirocco. You don't know where the wind comes from, but it seems to blow away the locusts."

Personal life and legacy 
Darius Jhabvala married Sarica Agondo, who he met at Columbia and they had four children, Murzban, Jamasp, Tehemura, and Kirman.

References

External links 

 A detailed obituary presented by Joe Moakley in the United States Congress

1936 births
1974 deaths
American reporters and correspondents
American people of Parsi descent
American Zoroastrians
Parsi people from Mumbai
Indian journalists